Menemerus cummingorum is a species of jumping spider in the genus Menemerus that lives in Zimbabwe. It was first described by Wanda Wesołowska in 2007.

References

Salticidae
Endemic fauna of Zimbabwe
Spiders of Africa
Spiders described in 2007
Taxa named by Wanda Wesołowska